Iolaea scitula is a species of sea snail, a marine gastropod mollusk in the family Pyramidellidae, the pyrams and their allies.

Description
The shell size varies between 1.5 mm and 4 mm.

Distribution
This marine species occurs off China, New Caledonia and the Solomon Islands.

References

 Higo, S., Callomon, P. & Goto, Y. (1999) Catalogue and Bibliography of the Marine Shell-Bearing Mollusca of Japan. Elle Scientific Publications, Yao, Japan, 749 pp.

External links
 To World Register of Marine Species
 

Pyramidellidae
Gastropods described in 1860